Changbin Township is a rural township in Taitung County, Taiwan. It is the northernmost township in Taitung County. The population of the township consists mainly of the Amis people with a Kavalan minority.

Geography

 Area: 155.19 km2
 Population: 6,722 people (February 2023)

Administrative divisions
The township comprises six villages: Changbin, Ningpu, Sanjian/Sanchien, Zhangyuan/Changyuan, Zhongyong/Chungyung and Zhuhu/Chuhu.

Tourist attractions

 Baxian Caves
 Chilin Ruins
 Chungyung Ruins

Transportation
 Changbin Port
 Wushibi Port

References

Townships in Taitung County